Þjóðfundur may refer to:

 Þjóðfundur 2009, the National Assembly of 2009
 Þjóðfundur 1851, the National Assembly of 1851